Athletics at the 2003 Games of the Small States of Europe were held at the Matthew Micallef St. John Athletic Stadium in Marsa, Malta between 3 and 7 June.

Medal summary

Men

Women

Men's results

100 metres

Heats – June 3Wind:Heat 1: +2.3 m/s, Heat 2: +1.8 m/s

Final – June 3Wind:+0.5 m/s

200 metres

Heats – June 5Wind:Heat 1: -0.1 m/s, Heat 2: -1.0 m/s

Final – June 7Wind:+0.3 m/s

400 metres

Heats – June 3

Final – June 5

800 metres
June 3

1500 metres
June 7

5000 metres
June 3

10,000 metres
June 5

3000 metres steeplechase
June 3

4 x 100 metres relay
June 7

4 x 400 metres relay
June 7

Long jump
June 5

Triple jump
June 3

Shot put
June 3

Discus throw
June 3

Javelin throw
June 5

Women's results

100 metres

Heats – June 3Wind:Heat 1: +0.5 m/s, Heat 2: +0.8 m/s

Final – June 3Wind:+1.6 m/s

200 metres

Heats – June 5Wind:Heat 1: -0.2 m/s, Heat 2: -1.6 m/s

Final – June 7Wind:0.0 m/s

400 metres
June 5

800 metres
June 3

1500 metres
June 7

5000 metres
June 5

10,000 metres
June 3

100 metres hurdles
June 5Wind: +1.2 m/s

4 x 100 metres relay
June 7

4 x 400 metres relay
June 7

Long jump
June 7

Triple jump
June 5

Discus throw
June 3

Javelin throw
June 5

Medal table

Participating nations

 (14)
 (43)
 (20)
 (4)
 (13)
 (29) (Host team)
 (18)
 (9)

References
Results (archived)

Games of the Small States of Europe Athletics
Athletics
2003
Athletics in Malta